Drohobych is a city of regional significance in Lviv Oblast, Ukraine. It is the administrative center of Drohobych Raion and hosts the administration of Drohobych urban hromada, one of the hromadas of Ukraine. In 1939–1941 and 1944–1959 it was the center of Drohobych Oblast.

The city was founded at the end of eleventh century as an important trading post and transport node between Kyiv Rus' and the lands to the West of Rus'. After extinction of the local Ruthenian dynasty and subsequent incorporation of the Kingdom of Galicia–Volhynia into the Polish Kingdom by 1349, from the fifteenth century the city was developing as a mercantile and saltworks centre. Drohobych became part of the Habsburg Empire in 1772 after the first partition of Polish–Lithuanian Commonwealth. In the mid-nineteenth century it became Europe's largest oil extraction center, which significantly contributed to its rapid development. In the renascent, interwar Poland it was the center of a county within the Lwów Voivodeship. In the outcome of World War II the city was incorporated into the Ukrainian part of the Soviet Union, which in 1991 became the independent Ukraine.

The city was the birthplace of such well-known personalities like Elisabeth Bergner, Yuriy Drohobych (Kotermak), Ivan Franko and Bruno Schulz. The city has several oil refineries. The Drohobych saltworks are considered to be the oldest in Europe. The estimated population of the city is

Administrative status
As the administrative center of Drohobych Raion (district), Drohobych itself is a city of oblast significance, subordinate directly to the oblast authorities, rather than to the raion administration located in the city itself.

History

While there are only legendary accounts of it, Drohobych probably existed in the Kievan Rus' period. According to a legend, there was a settlement, called Bych, of salt-traders. When Bych was destroyed in a Cumanian raid, survivors rebuilt the settlement in a nearby location under its current name which means a Second Bych. In the time of Kievan Rus', the Tustan fortress was built near Drohobych. However, scholars perceive this legend with skepticism, pointing out that Drohobych is a Polish pronunciation of Dorogobuzh, a common East Slavic toponym applied to three different towns in Kievan Rus'.

The city was first mentioned in 1387 in the municipal records of Lviv, in connection with a man named Martin (or Marcin) of Drohobych. Furthermore, the same chronicler's List of all Ruthenian cities, the farther and the near ones in Voskresensky Chronicle (dated 1377–82) mentions "Другабець" (Druhabets') among other cities in Volhynia that existed at the same time such as Холмъ (Kholm), Лвовъ Великій (Lviv the Great).

In 1392 Polish king Vladislav II ordered the construction of the first Roman Catholic municipal parish church (Polish: Kosciół farny), using the foundations of older Ruthenian buildings. In the Polish–Lithuanian Commonwealth, the city was the center of large rural starostvo (county within the Ruthenian Voivodeship).

Drohobych received Magdeburg rights some time in the 15th century (sources differ as to the exact year, some giving 1422 or 1460, or 1496 but in 1506 the rights were confirmed by King Alexander the Jagiellonian). The salt industry was significant in the fourteenth to sixteenth centuries.

From the early seventeenth century, a Ukrainian Catholic brotherhood existed in the city. In 1648, during the Khmelnytsky Uprising, the Cossacks stormed the city and its cathedral. Most of the local Poles, as well as the Greek Catholics and the Jews, were murdered at the time, while some managed to survive in the Bell tower not taken in the raid. The 1772 partition of Poland gave the city to the Habsburg monarchy. In the 19th century, significant oil resources were discovered in the area, making the city an important center of the oil and natural gas industries.

After the World War I, the area became part of the short-lived independent West Ukrainian People's Republic (Zakhidnoukrayins’ka Narodna Respublika; ZUNR). The ZUNR was taken over by the Second Polish Republic in the event of Polish–Ukrainian War and Drohobych became part of the Lwów Voivodeship in 1919. In 1928 the still extant Ukrainian private gymnasium (academically oriented secondary school) opened in the center of the city. The population reached some 40,000 in the late 1920s, and its oil refinery at Polmin became one of the biggest in Europe, employing 800 people. Numerous visitors came there to view the wooden Greek Catholic churches, among them the Church of St. Yur, which was regarded as the most beautiful such construction in the Second Polish Republic, with frescoes from 1691. Drohobych was also a major sports center (see: Junak Drohobycz).

In September 1939, as a result of German and Soviet invasion of Poland the city was annexed to Soviet Ukraine when the territory of the interwar Poland was divided between the Nazi Germany and the USSR according to the Ribbentrop-Molotov agreement. After the invasion Nazi Germany wanted to incorporate the city into its General Government as the result of its oil fields, but the USSR refused and annexed it. In Soviet Ukraine, Drohobych became the center of the Drohobych Oblast (region). Its local Polish boy scouts created the White Couriers organization, which in late 1939 and early 1940 smuggled hundreds of people from the Soviet Union to Hungary, across the Soviet-Hungarian border in the Carpathian Mountains. In early July 1941, during the first weeks of the Nazi invasion of the USSR, the city was occupied by Nazi Germany.

Pre-war Drohobych had a significant Jewish community of about 15,000 people, 40 % of the total population. Immediately after the Germans entered the city, Ukrainian nationalists started a pogrom, lasting for three days, supported by the Wehrmacht. During 1942 there were several selections, deportations, and murders in the streets, again led out by German troops and Ukrainian Auxiliary Police. In October 1942, Drohobych ghetto with approximately 10,000 people imprisoned was established, also with Jews brought from neighboring localities. In June 1943, the German administration and troops liquidated the ghetto, only 800 Jews from Drohobych survived. On 6 August 1944, the German occupation ended with the Red Army entering the city. Despite the large Jewish population prior to the war, a current resident stated that he was one of only two Jews who came back to his village to live after the war. After the war, the city remained an oblast center until the Drohobych Oblast was incorporated into the Lviv Oblast in 1959. In Soviet times, Drohobych became an important industrial center of Western Ukraine with highly developed oil-refining, machine building, woodworking, food, and light industries.

Until 18 July 2020, Drohobych was designated as a city of oblast significance and belonged to Drohobych Municipality but not to Drohobych Raion even though it was the center of the raion. As part of the administrative reform of Ukraine, which reduced the number of raions of Lviv Oblast to seven, Drohobych Municipality was merged into Drohobych Raion.

Demographics
The population of Drohobych over the years was:
1931 – 32,300
1959 – 42,000
1978 – 65,998
1989 – 77,571
2001 – 79,119
2010 – 78,368
2022 – 73,682

Drohobych district

In 1931, the total population of the Drohobych district was 194,456, distributed among various languages:
Polish: 91,935 (47.3%)
Ukrainian: 79,214 (40.7%)
Yiddish: 20,484 (10.5%)

In January 2007, the total population of the metropolitan area was over 103,000 inhabitants.

Climate

Economy
Industries currently based in the city include oil-refineries, chemicals, machinery, metallurgy, and food processing.

Sport
The city was home to one of Poland's best pre-war football clubs; Junak Drohobycz. It was disbanded in 1939 due to the Soviet invasion of Poland.

Halychyna Drohobych, founded in 1989 as Naftovyk Drohobych currently represents the city.

Sights

St. George's Church, Drohobych (c. 1500)
St. Bartholomew Church, Drohobych (1392–16th century)
its bell tower, former castle tower (late 13th century and 15th century)
Ascension Church, Drohobych (late 15th century)
Holy Cross Church, Drohobych (early 16th century)
Choral Synagogue (1842–1865)
Progressive Synagogue, Drohobych
City Hall, Drohobych (1920s)
St. Peter's and Paul's Monastery, Drohobych
Drohobych Museum

Notable people

Politics
Zenon Kossak, Ukrainian military and political leader (born here)
Andriy Melnyk, Ukrainian military and political leader (born near Drohobych)
David Horowitz (economist), Israeli economist and the first Governor of the Bank of Israel.
Leon Reich (1879–1929), lawyer and member of the Sejm of Poland (born here)

Arts
Ivan Franko, Ukrainian poet and writer, born in Nahuievychi, near Drohobych
Irene Frisch, Jewish-Polish writer and memoirist
Leopold Gottlieb, Jewish-Polish painter
Maurycy Gottlieb, Jewish-Polish painter
Diana Reiter, Jewish-Polish architect, victim of Holocaust
Ephraim Moses Lilien, Jewish-Zionist painter
Alfred Schreyer, Jewish-Polish vocalist and violinist
Bruno Schulz, Polish-Jewish writer, graphic artist, and literary critic
Kazimierz Wierzyński, Polish poet and writer
David Grunschlag, violinist, founding member and concertmaster of Israel philharmonic orchestra (1936-1959) first violinist Philadelphia  Orchestra (1960-1984)

Other fields
Tadeusz Chciuk-Celt, Polish war hero
Yuriy Drohobych, first doctor of medicine in Ukraine, 1481–1482 rector of the University of Bologna
Yaroslav Popovych, cyclist (born here)
Józef Schreier, Polish-Jewish mathematician
Viktor Vekselberg, Russian oligarch

Twin towns and sister cities
Drohobych is twinned with:

References

External links

Drohobych Info - biggest news site 
Drohobych - city portal 
Drohobych.com - Drohobych city administration website 
Drohobych in Verkhovna Rada of Ukraine database 
Drohobych the King's city 
Drohobych.Net 
Stories by Irene Frisch, a Drohobych-born Holocaust Survivor
Drohobych in Encyclopedia of Ukraine
Seminary of Blessed Martyrs Severyn, Yakym and Vitalij of Ukrainian Greek Catholic Church, in Drohobych
Drohobych during the period of Nazism (PHOTOS)
 

 
Cities in Lviv Oblast
Lwów Voivodeship
Ruthenian Voivodeship
Shtetls
Cities of regional significance in Ukraine
Holocaust locations in Ukraine
Populated places on the Dniester River in Ukraine